FK Lofoten is a Norwegian football club, currently playing in the 4. Divisjon. The club was formed as a merger between Svolvær IL and Kabelvåg IL in 1992. The club played in the 1. divisjon in the 1999 season, but was relegated after one season.

History
The club played in the 1. divisjon in the 1999 season, but they were however relegated in their only season at the second tier. In the decisive match on 17 October 1999, Lofoten had to win away against Sogndal while Byåsen and Skjetten had to draw if Lofoten was going to avoid relegation. Lofoten did their job by beating Sogndal 2–0, and in the match between Byåsen and Skjetten the score was 1-1 after 90 minutes. Byåsen did however score a winning goal in the stoppage time and Lofoten were relegated.

The goal for the 2000 season was to again win promotion. Lofoten won their 2. divisjon group, but lost the play-off matches for promotion against Mandalskameratene.
After the 2. Divisjon was changed from eight to four groups, the group-winners would automatically win promotion. Lofoten was fighting for promotion for a couple of years, but never managed to win their group again. Due to the poor economy the club lost several of its most important players, and as a consequence Lofoten was relegated to the 3. divisjon in 2005.

The club was promoted to the 2. Divisjon in 2007, after winning their 3. Divisjon group and beat Innstrand 4–3 on aggregate in the play-off matches for promotion.

In the 2007 Norwegian Football Cup, Lofoten won the qualifying matches against Grovfjord, and was drawn against the 2. Divisjon team Mjølner in the first round. After eliminating Mjølner, Lofoten met the regional greats Bodø/Glimt in the second round. Lofoten lost 1–3 after extra time at home against the 1. Divisjon team.

In the 2008 season, Lofoten finished last in their 2. Divisjon group and were relegated to the 3. divisjon.

Recent history
{|class="wikitable"
|-bgcolor="#efefef"
! Season
!
! Pos.
! Pl.
! W
! D
! L
! GS
! GA
! P
!Cup
!Notes
|-
|1999
|1. divisjon
|align=right bgcolor="#FFCCCC"| 11
|align=right|26||align=right|8||align=right|6||align=right|12
|align=right|38||align=right|47||align=right|30
|Second round
|relegated to the 2. divisjon
|-
|2000
|2. divisjon
|align=right |1
|align=right|22||align=right|20||align=right|0||align=right|2
|align=right|90||align=right|25||align=right|60
|Third round
|
|-
|2001
|2. divisjon
|align=right |3
|align=right|26||align=right|15||align=right|6||align=right|5
|align=right|63||align=right|43||align=right|51
|First round
|
|-
|2002
|2. divisjon
|align=right |5
|align=right|26||align=right|11||align=right|8||align=right|7
|align=right|53||align=right|41||align=right|41
|Second round
|
|-
|2003
|2. divisjon
|align=right |6
|align=right|26||align=right|12||align=right|4||align=right|10
|align=right|41||align=right|46||align=right|40
|Third round
|
|-
|2004
|2. divisjon
|align=right |10
|align=right|26||align=right|10||align=right|2||align=right|14
|align=right|50||align=right|66||align=right|32
|Third round
|
|-
|2005
|2. divisjon
|align=right bgcolor="#FFCCCC"| 13
|align=right|26||align=right|7||align=right|2||align=right|17
|align=right|40||align=right|89||align=right|23
|Second round
|relegated to the 3. divisjon
|-
|2006
|3. divisjon
|align=right |2
|align=right|22||align=right|15||align=right|1||align=right|6
|align=right|77||align=right|30||align=right|46
|First round
|
|-
|2007
|3. divisjon
|align=right bgcolor=#DDFFDD| 1
|align=right|18||align=right|14||align=right|3||align=right|1
|align=right|62||align=right|14||align=right|45
|Second round
|promoted to the 2. divisjon
|-
|2008
|2. divisjon
|align=right bgcolor="#FFCCCC"| 14
|align=right|26||align=right|3||align=right|2||align=right|21
|align=right|35||align=right|90||align=right|11
|First round
|relegated to the 3. divisjon
|-
|2009
|3. divisjon
|align=right |5
|align=right|20||align=right|8||align=right|2||align=right|10
|align=right|47||align=right|54||align=right|26
|First qualifying round 	
|
|-
|2010
|3. divisjon
|align=right |4
|align=right|22||align=right|13||align=right|3||align=right|6
|align=right|64||align=right|40||align=right|42
|First qualifying round 
|
|-
|2011 
|3. divisjon
|align=right |6
|align=right|22||align=right|11||align=right|3||align=right|8
|align=right|64||align=right|45||align=right|36
|First qualifying round 
|
|-
|2012
|3. divisjon
|align=right |7
|align=right|22||align=right|7||align=right|6||align=right|9
|align=right|53||align=right|60||align=right|27
|Second qualifying round 
|
|-
|2013
|3. divisjon
|align=right |4
|align=right|22||align=right|11||align=right|4||align=right|7
|align=right|48||align=right|44||align=right|37
|Second qualifying round 
|
|-
|2014 
|3. divisjon
|align=right  bgcolor="#FFCCCC"| 10
|align=right|22||align=right|6||align=right|0||align=right|16
|align=right|43||align=right|76||align=right|18
|First qualifying round 
|relegated to the 4. Divisjon
|-
|2015 
|4. Divisjon
|align=right bgcolor=#DDFFDD| 1
|align=right|22||align=right|19||align=right|2||align=right|1
|align=right|103||align=right|16||align=right|59
|First qualifying round 
|promoted to the 3. divisjon
|-
|2016 
|3. divisjon
|align=right  bgcolor="#FFCCCC"| 11
|align=right|22||align=right|7||align=right|0||align=right|15
|align=right|45||align=right|69||align=right|21
|Second qualifying round 
|relegated to the 4. Divisjon
|-
|2017 
|4. Divisjon
|align=right | 2
|align=right|22||align=right|15||align=right|5||align=right|2
|align=right|109||align=right|38||align=right|50
|First qualifying round 
|
|-
|2018 
|4. Divisjon
|align=right | 7
|align=right|22||align=right|8||align=right|6||align=right|8
|align=right|60||align=right|46||align=right|30
|Second qualifying round 
|
|-
|2019
|4. Divisjon
|align=right | 2
|align=right|20||align=right|13||align=right|2||align=right|5
|align=right|69||align=right|40||align=right|41
|First qualifying round 
|
|-
|2021
|4. Divisjon
|align=right | 5
|align=right|8||align=right|4||align=right|0||align=right|4
|align=right|25||align=right|21||align=right|12
|First qualifying round 
|
|-
|2022 (in progress)
|4. Divisjon
|align=right | 2
|align=right|8||align=right|6||align=right|0||align=right|2
|align=right|28||align=right|18||align=right|18
|First qualifying round 
|
|}

Current squad
''As of 30 April 2022.

Honours 
Champions 2. divisjon avd. 8: 1997, 1998 and 2000
Champions 3. divisjon avd. 17: 1994 and 1996
Champions 3. divisjon avd. Hålogaland: 2007
Best Finish: 11th place i 1. divisjon (1999)
Best Cup Run: 3rd round i 2000, 2003 and 2004

Notable players 
Stig Johansen
Petter Solli
Bjørn Strøm
Andreas Knutzen
Vegard Hansen
Hans Jørgen Andersen
Odd-Karl Stangnes
Stein Berg Johansen
Vegard Berg Johansen
Vegard Lysvoll
Daniel Aga

References 

Sport in Nordland
Football clubs in Norway
Association football clubs established in 1992
1992 establishments in Norway